Platte County School District #3 is a public school district based in Platte City, Missouri, United States.

Geography 
Platte County School District #3 serves Platte County. The school district encloses some of Kansas City International Airport.

Schools 
The school district is split into two campuses. The original campus is the Platte City campus, within the town limits of Platte City. It includes the following schools.
 Great Beginnings, Preschool & Early Childhood
 Compass Elementary, Grades K-5
 Siegrist Elementary, Grades K-5
 Platte City Middle School, Grades 6-8
 Platte County High School, Grades 9-12
 Northland Career Center, Area Vocational-Technical School
The Barry Heights neighborhood in the south part of the county is the location of the Barry campus, which includes:
 Pathfinder Elementary, Grades K-4
 Barry School, Grades 5-8 + Early Childhood

Student demographics 
Up from 1,886 students in the 1996–1997 school year, the district currently serves 3,952 students in the 2015–2016 school year.

See also 
 List of school districts in Missouri

References

External links 
 

Education in Platte County, Missouri
School districts in Missouri